Andrew Clemens (c. January 29, 1857 – May 14, 1894) was a sand artist from Iowa in the United States. Clemens formed his pictures by compressing natural colored sands inside chemists' jars to create his works of art.

Early life
Andrew Clemens was born in Dubuque, Iowa, on January 29, 1857. The year 1857 is given as his birth year in his obituary in the North Iowa Times, in his death record, and on his gravestone, and he is listed as being 37 years, 4 mos., and 13 days old in his obituary.  (Obituary from the McGregor News newspaper, May 16, 1894, page 3) The Clemens family moved to McGregor, Iowa, from Dubuque, in June 1857 (when Andrew was approximately five months old).

At a young age Andrew experienced encephalitis which caused his lifelong deafness. At the age of 13 Clemens was entered into the Iowa State School for the Deaf in Council Bluffs, Iowa.

Art
Clemens' sandpainting career blossomed during his summer vacations from the State School, when he would spend time honing his craft. He would collect naturally colored grains of sand from an area in Pikes Peak State Park known as Pictured Rocks. At Pictured Rocks, the basal portion of the sandstone near the Sand Cave is naturally colored by iron and mineral staining. Clemens separated the sand grains into piles, by color, and used them to form the basis for his art.

To create his art he inserted the presorted grains of sand into small glass drug bottles using homemade tools formed out of hickory sticks and florists wire. His process utilized no glue and pressure from the other sand grains alone held the artwork together. When Clemens completed a sand bottle he sealed the bottle with a stopper and wax. At first, Clemens' work was simple and geometric in nature, diamond shaped patterns against an ivory white background was a regular motif in his earliest work.

His technique improved gradually and eventually people wanted to buy his work, which now included overtones, shading and complex designs such as landscapes. He created most of his work between 1880 and 1886 and is acknowledged as the inventor and possibly the sole practitioner of his art form. During his lifetime, it is thought that Clemens produced hundreds of his sand bottles but few survive today. The more complex subjects of Clemens' work ranged from steamboats, flowers, eagles, and flags and he often created custom bottles with scenes of his client's choosing. He created many of his images upside down.  Upon completion, Clemens would secure the stopper in the bottle, and flip it right side up. The most complex of his designs could take up to a year to complete.

When he was 17 (in the summer of 1874) Andrew Clemens advertised his sand bottles in the North Iowa Times, McGregor, Iowa.  Andrew returned to McGregor to live year-round after a fire at the State School for the Deaf destroyed the dorm where he had lived. Andrew had been offered a job as a teacher there, but declined the offer.  Clemens showed his work at the Saint Paul Dime Museum in 1889.  He earned an invitation to demonstrate his work at the 1893 Chicago Columbian Exposition, which he declined due to his failing health. His artwork sold for $5–7 at the time. In 2004, a Clemens' sand art glass bottle sold for $12,075 at auction. At another auction, a pair of his bottles were estimated to sell for $25,000-$35,000 but failed to sell. At auction in 2012, a Clemens sand bottle from the Paul Brenner Iowa Collection sold for $45,000 plus buyer's premium in Des Moines, Iowa. A floral and patriotic eagle sand bottle by Clemens made for Mrs. Eliza B. Lewis sold for $132,000 including buyer's premium in Cincinnati, Ohio, on October 6, 2018. A new record for a Clemens sand bottle was set on November 23, 2020, when a presentation bottle dedicated to Dr. Prosper Harvey Ellsworth sold for $275,000 in Skinner's online American furniture and decorative arts auction.

A comprehensive book, The Sand Art Bottles of Andrew Clemens, was published in 2015 and includes numerous pictures of his sand bottles.

Late life
A funeral notice, circulated around McGregor when Clemens died, stated in part that his funeral was to be held on May 14, 1894, when Clemens was 37 years old.

See also
Sand art and play

References

External links
Images of Clemens' sand bottles: 
Examples of sand art bottles: 
Andrew Clemens Facebook Page: 

Artists from Iowa
Folk artists
Deaf artists
People from Dubuque, Iowa
1852 births
1894 deaths
American deaf people
19th-century American artists
19th-century American male artists